This page provides a list of Haitian artists. People on this list were either born in Haiti or possess Haitian citizenship. Due to Haitian nationality laws, dual citizenship is now permitted by the Constitution of Haiti, therefore people of Haitian ancestry born outside of the country are not included in this list, unless they have renounced their foreign citizenship or have resided extensively in Haiti and made significant contributions to Haitian government or society. The list includes both native born and naturalized Haitians, as well as permanent foreign residents who have been recognized internationally for artistic reasons. If not indicated here, their birth in Haiti and notability are mentioned in their main article.

 Gesner Abelard (born 1922) – painter and sculptor
 Ralph Allen – painter
 Gabriel Alix (1930-1998) – painter
 Jackson Ambroise (born 1952) – painter
 Sergine André (born 1969) – painter
 Montas Antoine (1926-1988) – painter
 Arijac (born 1937) – painter
 Gesner Armand (1936-2008) – painter
 Georges Auguste (1846-1935) – painter
 Castera Bazile (1923-1966) – painter
 Thony Belizaire (1955-2013) – photographer and photojournalist
 Rigaud Benoit (1911-1986) – one of the three or four most highly prized Haitian artists
 Wilson Bigaud (1931-2010) – painter
 Roland Blain (1934–2005) – painter
 Serge Moléon Blaise (born 1951) – painter
 Gérald Bloncourt (1926-2018) – painter and photographer
 Ludovic Booz (1940-2015) – painter and sculptor
 Maurice Borno (1917-1955) – painter
 Seymour Etienne Bottex (1922-1998) – painter
 Henry-Robert Brésil (1952-1999) – painter
 Murat Brierre (1938-1988) – one of Haiti's principal metal sculptors
 Jean-Baptiste Bottex (1918-1979) – painter
 Bourmond Byron (1920-2004) – painter
 Laurent Casimir (1928-1990) – artist
 Jean-Claude Castera (born 1939) – painter
 Dieudonné Cédor (1925-2010) – painter
 Ralph Chapoteau (born 1954) – painter
 Charles Frédéric Chassériau (1802-1896) – chief architect of Marseille and Algiers
 Etienne Chavannes (born 1939) – painter
 Villard Denis (1940-2004) – painter and poet
 Rose-Marie Desruisseau (1933-1988) – painter
 Philippe Dodard (born 1954) – graphic artist and painter
 Roland Dorcely (1930-2017) – painter
 Nicolas Dreux (born 1956) – painter
 Abner Dubic (born 1944) – painter
 Gervais Emmanuel Ducasse (1903-1988) – painter
 Préfète Duffaut (1923-2012) – painter
 Edouard Duval-Carrié (born 1954) – painter and sculptor
 Levoy Exil (born 1944) – major contributor to the Saint Soleil art movement
 Louisiane Saint Fleurant (1924-2005) – artist and painter
 Gérard Fombrun (1927–2015) – sculptor
 Jacques Gabriel (1934-1988) – painter
 Paul Gardère (1944-2011) - visual artist
 Jean-Claude Garoute (1935-2006) – painter and sculptor
Jackson Georges (born 1974) – painter
 Max Gerbier (born 1951) – painter
 Jacques-Enguerrand Gourgue (1930-1996) – one of Haiti's most renowned painters of the 20th century
 Alexandre Grégoire (1922-2001) – painter
 Georges Hector (1939-1990) – painter
 Edith Hollant (born 1938) – photographer and painter
 Hector Hyppolite (1894-1948) – painter
 Eugène Jean (1714-1734) – painter
 Jean-Baptiste Jean (1953-2002) – painter
 Nehemy Jean (born 1931) – painter and graphic artist
 Jean-Louis (1928-1990) – painter
 Eric Jean-Louis (born 1957) – painter
 Jean-René Jérôme (1942-1991) – painter, and considered one of Haiti's greatest artists
 Guy Joachim (born 1955) – painter
 Serge Jolimeau (born 1952) - sculptor 
 Jacqueline Nesti Joseph (born 1932) – painter
 Antonio Joseph (1921-2016) – painter, sculptor, and screen-printer<
 Leonel Jules (born 1953) – painter
 André Juste (born 1957) – sculptor
 Gisou Lamothe (1935–2020) – painter and sculptor
 Lyonel Laurenceau (born 1942) – painter
 Peterson Laurent (1888-1958) – painter
 Luckner Lazard (1928-1998) – painter and sculptor
 André LeBlanc (1921-1998) – renowned comic book artist
 Stevenson Magloire (1963-1994) – painter
 Andrée Malebranche (1916-2013) – painter
 Albert Mangonès (1917-2002) – architect
 Madsen Mompremier (born 1952) - painter
 Marie-José Nadal-Gardère (1931-2020) – painter and sculptor
 Charles Obas (born 1927) – painter
 Philomé Obin (1892-1986) – painter
 Francis Paraison (1958-2003) – painter
 Salnave Philippe-Auguste (1908-1989) - painter, joined Le Centre d'Art in 1960.
 André Pierre (1914-2005) - painter
 Prosper Pierre-Louis (1947-1997) – artist, painter; and one of the main contributors to the local school of the Saint Soleil art movement
 Guerdy J. Préval (born 1950) – painter and essayist
 Barbara Prézeau-Stephenson (born 1965) – painter, sculptor, land art
 Samuel Roker (born 1953) – painter
 Petion Savain (1906-1973) – prolific painter
 Galland Semerand (1953-2019) – painter and architect
 Hervé Télémaque – surrealist painter, curator
 Sacha Thébaud (1934-2004) – aka "Tebó", artist, sculptor, architect, furniture designer and known for encaustics in international contemporary fine art
Edouard Wah (1939-2003) – painter
François Turenne des Pres (1907-1990)

Citations

Bibliography 

  

artists
Haitian